Ann Patricia Wood is a retired British biochemist and bacteriologist who specialized in the ecology, taxonomy and physiology of sulfur-oxidizing chemolithoautotrophic bacteria and how methylotrophic bacteria play a role in the degradation of odour causing compounds in the human mouth, vagina and skin. The bacterial genus Annwoodia was named to honor her contributions to microbial research in 2017.

Education and career 
Wood earned her Ph.D. in 1977 from Queen Elizabeth College working on the growth of Paracoccus versutus strain A2 (then "Thiobacillus sp. A2"). Wood worked at the University of Warwick from the mid-1970s until the late 1980s and then King’s College London as a Lecturer and Senior Lecturer from June 1991 to August 2015 when she retired. Wood was a member of the Editorial Board of Archives of Microbiology.

Research 
Wood's post-2000 work is associated with odours in the mouth, work that was covered in the popular press. She has also examined the link between odours in the feet, as well as the bacteria in bacterial vaginosis and periodontitis. She has also investigated the presence and role of methylotrophic bacteria in the natural world, including as symbionts of Thyasira flexuosa Montagu and living in association with Tagetes erecta L. These natural settings have included such places as the River Thames, thermal sulfur springs, and in Antarctica. Beyond studying the presence and effect of methylotrophs and sulfur oxidizing bacteria, she looked at their metabolism, taxonomy and diversity/

Wood's research on microbial use of one-carbon organic compounds that contain sulfur was reviewedin a 2018 publication, which named two metabolic pathways after Wood: the Padden-Wood pathway based on work with Xanthobacter tagetidis, an organism able to grow on substituted thiophenes, and the Borodonia-Wood pathway based on microbial growth on dimethylsulfone and dimethylsulfide in Hyphomicrobium sulfonivorans.

Taxa named by Wood 

The genera Acidithiobacillus and Thermithiobacillus of the class Acidithiobacillia, Halothiobacillus of the class Gammaproteobacteria and Starkeya of the Alphaproteobacteria, all in the phylum Pseudomonadota

The species Annwoodia aquaesulis (originally Thiobacillus aquaesulis) of the Betaproteobacteria; the species Methylorubrum podarium (originally Methylobacterium podarium), Methylorubrum thiocyanatum (originally Methylobacterium thiocyanatum), Hyphomicrobium sulfonivorans and Xanthobacter tagetidis of the Alphaproteobacteria; the species Guyparkeria halophila (originally Thiobacillus halophilus and later Halothiobacillus halophilus) of the Gammaproteobacteria, all in the phylum Pseudomonadota.
The species Pseudarthrobacter sulfonivorans (originally Arthobacter sulfonivorans) and Arthrobacter methylotrophus of the Actinomycetota in the phylum Actinomycetota.

Selected publications

Honors and awards 
In 2017, the bacterial genus Annwoodia was named in honor of the contributions made by Wood, including her description of the type species Annwoodia aquaesulis, originally described as a member of the genus Thiobacillus, and her "significant contributions to the taxonomy of the ‘sulfur bacteria’ and methylotrophic "Proteobacteria" [now Pseudomonadota], their physiology and ecology".

References 

Women microbiologists
British microbiologists
Academics of the University of Warwick
Alumni of the University of London
Alumni of Queen Elizabeth College
Academics of King's College London
1952 births
Living people
People from Yorkshire